Dror Hagag (born December 31, 1978) is an Israeli former professional basketball player of a Tunisian-Jewish descent. He plays at the point guard position. He last played with the pro club Maccabi Ashdod.  He also played for the Israeli National Team.

Professional career
Hajaj was the Israeli Super League 6th Man of the Year in 2004. At 178 centimeters (5'10"), he was the joint-shortest player in the Israeli League in the Israeli 2007–08 season, along with Jerel Blassingame. In 2008, Hagag signed a two-year contract with the EuroLeague club Maccabi Tel Aviv. On 12 August 2009 he was released from his contract and signed with Israeli vice-champion Maccabi Haifa.

Pro clubs
Maccabi Rishon LeZion (1996–1997)
Hapoel Bat Yam (1997–1998)
Maccabi Giv'at Shmuel (1998–2001)
Hapoel Tel Aviv (2001–2004)
Passe-Partout Leuven (2004–2005)
AEK Athens (2005–2006)
Miami Heat (2006)
Hapoel Jerusalem (2006–2008)
Maccabi Tel Aviv (2008–2009)
Maccabi Haifa (2009–2010)
Elitzur Ashkelon (2010–2011)
Maccabi Ashdod (2011–2013)
Maccabi Rishon LeZion (2013–2014)
Maccabi Ashdod (2014–2015)

Israeli national team
Israeli national team (EuroBasket 2005, 2007)

References

External links
Israeli League profile
Dror Hajaj Safsal
Dror Hajaj Euroleague

1978 births
Living people
Israeli Jews
Israeli men's basketball players
Israeli Basketball Premier League players
Jewish men's basketball players
Maccabi Rishon LeZion basketball players
Maccabi Givat Shmuel players
Hapoel Tel Aviv B.C. players
Leuven Bears players
AEK B.C. players
Hapoel Jerusalem B.C. players
Maccabi Tel Aviv B.C. players
Maccabi Haifa B.C. players
Ironi Ashkelon players
Maccabi Ashdod B.C. players
Point guards
Sportspeople from Rishon LeZion
Israeli people of Tunisian-Jewish descent